The 2012 Sparta Prague Open was a professional tennis tournament played on clay courts. It was the third edition of the tournament which was part of the 2012 ITF Women's Circuit. It took place at the Tennis Club Sparta Prague in Prague, Czech Republic, from 14 to 20 May 2012.

WTA entrants

Seeds 

 1 Rankings as of 7 May 2012

Other entrants 
The following players received wildcards into the singles main draw:
  Denisa Allertová
  Jana Čepelová
  Martina Přádová
  Tereza Smitková

The following players received entry from the qualifying draw:
  Annika Beck
  Monica Puig
  Anastasija Sevastova
  Zhang Shuai

The following players received entry into the singles main draw as lucky losers:
  Rika Fujiwara
  Sandra Záhlavová

Champions

Singles 

  Lucie Šafářová def.  Klára Zakopalová 6–3, 7–5

Doubles 

  Alizé Cornet /  Virginie Razzano def.  Akgul Amanmuradova /  Casey Dellacqua 6–2, 6–3

External links 
 ITF Search
 

Sparta Prague Open
WTA Prague Open
2012 in Czech tennis